The Benbolt Formation is a geologic formation in Kentucky. It preserves fossils dating back to the Ordovician period .

See also

 List of fossiliferous stratigraphic units in Kentucky

References
 

Ordovician Kentucky
Ordovician geology of Tennessee
Ordovician geology of Virginia
Ordovician southern paleotemperate deposits